The title of Count of Zutphen historically belonged to the ruler of the Dutch province of Gelderland (Zutphen being one of the major cities in the province during the medieval period). The lordship was a vassal title before it eventually became a county itself.

The line of the Counts of Zutphen became extinct in the 12th century and the title passed again onto the rulers of Guelders, who eventually sold its titles to the duke of Burgundy. After the Guelders Wars, both Guelders and Zupthen ended as part of the Spanish Netherlands until Gelderland became one of the provinces to revolt and form the United Provinces.

Lords of Zutphen 

 920 – 998/1001: Megingoz of Guelders († ap.  998/1001)
Married Gerberga of Lorraine
 1002-1025: Otton Ier de Hammerstein († 1036), comte de Hamaland, fils d'Herbert, comte dans le Kinziggau, et d'Ermentrude, elle-même fille de Mégingoz et de Gerberge
marié à Ermengarde de Verdun
 1025-1031: Luidolf of Lotharingia († 1031)
marié en 1025 à Mathilde de Hammerstein, fille du précédent
 1031-1033: Henri Ier le Vieux († 1118), fils des précédents
 1033-1042: Conrad Ier († 1055), duc de Bavière (Conrad II) de 1049 à 1053, frère du précédent
 mariée à Judith de Schweinfurt († 1106)
 1042-1044: Gothelon Ier de Verdun, duc de Basse-Lotharingie, frère d'Ermengarde de Verdun.
 1044-1046: Godefroy II, duc de Basse-Lotharingie, fils du précédent
 1046-1063: Gottschalk de Twente († 1063)
 marié à Adélaïde, sœur de Conrad Ier
 1062-1101: Otto II the Rich († 1113), son of the former

The House of Zutphen comes into existence in 1018 when Otto of Hammerstein becomes the first Lord of Zutphen. In 1046 Henry III, emperor of Germany gives Zutphen to Bishop Bernold of Utrecht. The Lords of Zutphen do not recognize this gift, which leads to some confusion regarding who actually owns Zutphen.

 (1018 - 1025) Otto of Hammerstein
 (1025 - 1031) Ludolf Ezzonen, receives Zutphen when he marries Mathilda, daughter of Otto of Hammerstein, Lord of Zutphen
After Ludolf's death it is possible that Zutphen was always intended for Adelheid of Zutphen. It would eventually go to her husband Gottschalk.
 (1046 - 1063) Gottschalk of Zutphen Lord of Zutphen though his marriage to Adelheid of Zutphen, daughter of Ludolf and Mathilda
 1063-1101: Otto II the Rich († 1113) Lord of Zutphen from 1063 until 1101, when he is elevated to Count of Zutphen.

Counts of Zutphen 
 1101-1113: Otto II the Rich († 1113) Made Count of Zutphen in 1101
 married Judith of Arnstein
 1113-1127: Henri II the elder († 1127), son of the former
 1127-1138: Ermengarde († 1138), sister of the former, married:
Gerard II († 1131), count of Guelders and of Wassenberg
Conrad II († 1136), count of Luxembourg
 1138-1182: Henry III († 1182), count of Guelders and of Zutphen

Counts of Guelders

Sources 
 Genealogy of the count of Zutphen 

Zutphen
County of Zutphen
Zutphen
States and territories disestablished in the 1180s